Orbe-Boscéaz, also named Boscéay, is an archaeological site in Switzerland, located at the territory of the town of Orbe (Vaud).

Description 
On the site of Boscéaz, five pavilions protect the largest site of Roman mosaic in Switzerland. These mosaics decorated a vast Roman villa built between the first and the third century AD, including private baths and a temple dedicated to Mithra.

The first known mosaics are discovered in 1841., the Triton and the Labyrinth mosaics in 1845 (the latter is reburied the same year, then rediscovered in 1930), the Divinities mosaic in 1862, the laurel leaves mosaic in 1863 (reburied and rediscovered several times up to 1925), and the Mosaic of Achilles on the island of Skyros, discovered in 1993, is undergoing restoration. The first scientific excavations are conducted only in 1896, and the site is classified as an historical monument in 1900. In 1976, aerial photographs show the plan and the extent of the villa, with a residential part was more than 200 meters long.

Between 1986 and 2004, the villa was a field school for students in archaeology of université de Lausanne. These excavations allowed the study of the whole residential part of the domain (including the discovery of the ninth mosaic, now being restored). They also allowed to determine that the site was occupied since the Neolithic, but also during the Bronze Age and the Iron Age.

The whole site is classified by the Swiss Inventory of Cultural Property of National and Regional Significance. A welcome center houses a scale model of the villa, an introduction video and a shop.

Bibliography 

 
 
 
 von Gonzenbach Victorine, Les mosaïques romaines d'Orbe, Société suisse de Préhistoire et d'Archéologie, coll. " Guides archéologiques de la Suisse ", 1974
 
 Dubois Yves, Urba II., Ornementation et discours architectural de la villa romaine d'Orbe-Boscéaz, Lausanne, Cahiers d'Archéologie Romande 163–165, 2016
 Luginbhül Thierry et al., Vie de palais et travail d'esclaves, La villa romaine d'Orbe-Boscéaz, Lausanne, 2001, 120 p. (document available in pdf on this page )
 Paunier Daniel, Luginbhül Thierry et alii, Urba I. La villa romaine d'Orbe-Boscéaz, Genèse et devenir d’un grand domaine rural, Lausanne, Cahiers d'Archéologie Romande 161–162, 2016

References

External links 

 Fondation et association Pro Urba
 Archeoplus - Orbe (VD)

Cultural property of national significance in the canton of Vaud
Archaeological sites in Switzerland